Archibald Thompson MacIntyre (October 27, 1822 – January 1, 1900) was an American politician and lawyer, as well as an officer in the Confederate States Army during the American Civil War.

Biography
MacIntyre was born near Marion, Georgia, in 1822 and moved to Thomas County, Georgia, in 1826. He studied law in Monticello, Florida, and Macon, Georgia, before gaining admittance to the Georgia state bar in 1843 and becoming a practicing attorney in Thomasville, Georgia.

In 1849, MacIntyre was elected to the Georgia House of Representatives. He served as a Confederate States Army colonel in the Eleventh Infantry of the Georgia Guards during the Civil War.  After the war, he was a delegate to the State constitutional convention in 1865. MacIntyre was elected in 1870 as a Democrat to the U.S. House of Representatives to the 42nd Congress. He served one term from March 4, 1871, until March 3, 1873, and did not run for reelection in 1872

After his congressional service, MacIntyre continued practicing law in Thomasville. He also served on the board of trustees of the University of Georgia in Athens and the Georgia State Sanitarium. He died in Thomasville on January 1, 1900, and was buried in that city's Laurel Hill Cemetery.

References
 Retrieved on 2008-09-28

1822 births
1900 deaths
Democratic Party members of the Georgia House of Representatives
Confederate States Army officers
Georgia (U.S. state) lawyers
People of Georgia (U.S. state) in the American Civil War
University of Georgia people
Democratic Party members of the United States House of Representatives from Georgia (U.S. state)
American slave owners
19th-century American politicians
19th-century American lawyers